The Chalk Marl is a former geologic formation in England. It preserves fossils dating back to the Cretaceous period. Today this formation within the Chalk Group is called the West Melbury Marly Chalk Formation.

The Channel Tunnel was bored through Chalk Marl for its entire length.

See also 
 List of fossiliferous stratigraphic units in England

References 

Geologic formations of England
Geologic formations of France
Cretaceous England
Cretaceous France
Aptian Stage
Marl formations
Chalk
Open marine deposits